"Lady Marmalade" is a song written by Bob Crewe and Kenny Nolan, originally for Nolan's disco group. The song is famous for the repeated refrain of "Voulez-vous coucher avec moi?" in French as part of the chorus, a sexually suggestive line that translates into English as: "Do you want to sleep with me?" The song first became a popular hit when it was recorded in 1974 by the American R&B group Labelle and held the number-one spot on the Billboard Hot 100 chart for one week, and also topped the Canadian RPM national singles chart. In 2021, the Library of Congress selected Labelle's version for preservation in the National Recording Registry for being "culturally, historically, or artistically significant."

The song has had many cover versions over the years. In 1998, girl group All Saints released a cover of the song that peaked at number one on the UK Singles Chart. The 2001 version by singers Christina Aguilera, Mýa, Pink and rapper Lil' Kim, recorded for the Moulin Rouge! soundtrack, was a number-one hit on the Billboard Hot 100 for five weeks, and also a number-one hit in the UK. "Lady Marmalade" was the ninth song to reach number one by two different musical acts in America.

Labelle version

Background and release

The song was written by Bob Crewe and Kenny Nolan, and was inspired by Crewe's experiences in New Orleans and the sex workers in the area. A demo of the song was first recorded by The Eleventh Hour, a disco group made up of studio musicians fronted by Nolan on vocals. It was added in 1974 as a track on the Eleventh Hour's Greatest Hits LP, which did not chart. Crewe showed the song to Allen Toussaint in New Orleans, and Toussaint then decided to record the song with Labelle.

Labelle's version of "Lady Marmalade" was produced by Allen Toussaint and Vicki Wickham. It was released in November 1974 from Nightbirds, their first album after signing with Epic Records. Patti LaBelle sang lead vocals on "Lady Marmalade" with backing vocals being contributed by bandmates Nona Hendryx and Sarah Dash. The song is best known for the explicit French lyric "Voulez-vous coucher avec moi ce soir?" (English: "Do you want to sleep with me tonight?") in the refrain. "Lady Marmalade" is a song about a prostitute, although Patti LaBelle, the lead vocalist of the band, was completely oblivious to its overall message, saying: "I didn't know what it was about. I don't know French and nobody, I swear this is God's truth, nobody at all told me what I'd just sung a song about."

Reception
Steve Huey from AllMusic selected the song as one of the best tracks on Labelle's 1995 compilation Lady Marmalade: The Best of Patti and Labelle. Critic Robert Christgau described it as "great synthetic French-quarter raunch."

"Lady Marmalade" is billed as the song that made Labelle one of the "hottest girl groups" of the 1970s. It was a number-one hit for one week on the Billboard Hot 100 singles chart in the United States during the early spring of 1975, and charted at number one for one week on the Billboard Top Soul Singles chart. Along with the track, "What Can I Do for You?", "Lady Marmalade" peaked at number seven on the disco/dance charts. The single was also a major hit in the United Kingdom, where it charted at number seventeen . "Lady Marmalade" replaced another Crewe/Nolan composition, Frankie Valli's "My Eyes Adored You", as the Billboard Hot 100 number-one single. This feat made Crewe and Nolan the third songwriting team in Billboard history (after Lennon–McCartney and Holland–Dozier–Holland) to replace themselves at number one. Billboard ranked it as the No. 22 song for 1975. Labelle performed "Lady Marmalade" on Soul Train on December 7, 1974.

"Lady Marmalade" debuted at number 92 on the Canadian RPM singles chart on February 1, 1975. It subsequently peaked atop the chart on March 29, 1975, after five weeks on the chart. Labelle's version of "Lady Marmalade" was inducted into the Grammy Hall of Fame in 2003. and was ranked number 479 on Rolling Stones list of The 500 Greatest Songs of All Time in 2004 and number 485 in 2010. The Labelle version also appears in several films, including The Long Kiss Goodnight, Dick, and Jacob's Ladder. It was used in the video game Karaoke Revolution Volume 2 as a version performed with Patti LaBelle.

Billboard named the song number 16 on their list of 100 Greatest Girl Group Songs of All Time. In 2021, the Library of Congress selected the song for preservation in the National Recording Registry for being "culturally, historically, or artistically significant".

Track listings
 US 7-inch single
 "Lady Marmalade" – 3:14
 "Space Children" – 3:04

 Europe 7-inch single
 "Lady Marmalade" – 3:14
 "It Took a Long Time" – 4:04

Credits and personnel
 Lead vocals by Patti LaBelle
 Backing vocals by Sarah Dash and Nona Hendryx 
 Instrumentation by The Meters
 Allen Toussaint – RMI Electra Piano, percussion, arrangements
 Art Neville – Hammond organ
 George Porter Jr. – bass guitar
 Leo Nocentelli, Rev. Edward Levone Batts – guitar
 Herman "Roscoe" Ernest III – drums
 James "Budd" Ellison – piano
 Earl Turbinton – alto saxophone
 Alvin Thomas – tenor saxophone
 Clyde Kerr, Jr. - trumpet
 Lester Caliste – trombone
 Carl Blouin – baritone saxophone
 Clarence Ford – alto saxophone

Charts and certifications

Weekly charts

Year-end charts

Certifications

Sabrina version

Background and release
"Lady Marmalade" was covered by Italian pop star Sabrina on her eponymous album. It was released in 1987 as the album's second single by Baby Records. In some countries, including France and the Netherlands, the song was known as "Voulez-vous coucher avec moi? (Lady Marmalade)" and was released in 1988. Author James Arena named the cover among Sabrina's "relentlessly catchy" singles. The song charted at number 36 on the Belgian Flanders Singles Chart, number 40 on the Dutch Single Top 100, and number 41 on the French Singles Chart.

Track listings
 7-inch maxi
 "Lady Marmalade" – 3:55
 "Boys, Hot Girl, Sexy Girl" (7-inch megamix) – 4:10

 12-inch maxi
 "Lady Marmalade" (12-inch remix) – 5:57
 "Boys, Hot Girl, Sexy Girl" (12-inch megamix) – 6:04

 CD maxi
 "Lady Marmalade" (12-inch remix) – 6:08
 "Boys, Hot Girl, Sexy Girl" (megamix) – 6:04
 "Lady Marmalade" – 3:55
 Remixed by Peter Vriends, produced by Claudio Cecchetto

Charts

Credits and personnel
Credits for Sabrina's version are adapted from CD liner notes:
 Written by Bob Crewe and Kenny Nolan
 Design – Bart Falkmann
 Producer – C. Cecchetto
 Remix – Peter Vriends

All Saints version

Background and release
In 1998, English-Canadian girl group All Saints recorded a cover version of "Lady Marmalade" as part of the double A-sided single "Under the Bridge" / "Lady Marmalade". In Europe, only the "Lady Marmalade" single was released. The All Saints version contains different lyrics for its verses; the only lyrics retained from the original composition are the chorus. A version remixed by Timbaland appeared on the Dr. Dolittle soundtrack.

Reception
Daily Record described All Saints' version as a "passable version of LaBelle's disco classic." "Lady Marmalade" was the third single taken from their self-titled debut studio album; it contained the "Marmalade" cover and a cover version of "Under the Bridge" by Red Hot Chili Peppers. The single reached number one on the official UK Top 40 chart, becoming the group's second number-one hit. A total of 424,799 singles have been sold in the UK, with proceeds from the single going to breast cancer charities.

Music video
The music video for the song shows the band members and other people having a dance party on one of the floors of a skyscraper in New York City at night. British actress Kathryn Allerston appears in the music video.

Track listings

 All Saints CD maxi single
 "Lady Marmalade" ('98 mix) – 4:02
 "Lady Marmalade" (Mark's Miami Madness mix) – 7:55
 "Lady Marmalade" (Sharp South Park vocal remix) – 8:09
 "Lady Marmalade" (Henry & Hayne's La Jam mix) – 6:47

 All Saints CD 1
 "Under the Bridge" – 5:03
 "Lady Marmalade" – 4:04
 "No More Lies" – 4:08
 "Lady Marmalade" (Henry & Haynes La Jam mix) – 9:23
 "Under the Bridge" (promo video) – 5:00

 All Saints CD 2
 "Lady Marmalade" (Mark!'s Miami Madness mix) – 7:56
 "Lady Marmalade" (Sharp South Park vocal remix) – 8:10
 "Under the Bridge" (Ignorance remix featuring Jean Paul e.s.q) – 4:55
 "Get Bizzy" – 3:45

Charts

Weekly charts

Year-end charts

Certifications

Release history

Moulin Rouge! version

Background and release
In 2001, the song "Lady Marmalade" appeared as part of a medley in the film Moulin Rouge!. For the film's soundtrack album, Christina Aguilera, Lil' Kim, Mýa, and Pink recorded a cover version; it was released as the soundtrack's first single in April 2001. Produced by Missy Elliott and writing partner Rockwilder, it includes an intro and outro from Elliott. Lyrics were changed from the original version, transferring the song's setting from New Orleans to the Paris nightclub Moulin Rouge.

Aguilera said she embraced the idea of collaborating with Elliott, Pink, Mýa and Lil' Kim on the track as soon as it was pitched to her. "I'm a fan of all of theirs, and just to be in the same song doing something with them—collaborating, which I love to do, is a really big thing for me," she said. "And it's cool to be out there before my next album comes out there, too."

Critical reception
AllMusic's Brand Kohlenstein praised the song, saying that "the ladies teamed up for a surefire hit with their naughtier version of Patti Labelle's 'Lady Marmalade.'" Slant Magazine praised the collaboration as well, describing it as "an accolade to the performers' various distinctive styles, with Lil' Kim trashing it up and Aguilera caterwauling her way through the second half of the song." However, Rob Sheffield of Rolling Stone called the cover "god-awful". The Sun Journal opined that the Moulin Rouge! version helped the song "find a new life." MTV ranked "Lady Marmalade" at number six on the list of the best 2001 songs. Entertainment Weeklys Andrew Hampp named it the best all-female collaboration of the time span 1998–2018.

Chart performance
This version of the song reached number-one in its eighth week on the U.S. Billboard Hot 100 and spent five weeks at the top of the chart, 26 years after Labelle's version had reached number-one, making "Lady Marmalade" the ninth song in history to top the U.S. chart as performed as different artists. It was the third airplay-only song in Billboard chart history (after Aaliyah's 2000 single "Try Again" and Shaggy's 2001 single "Angel") to hit number one without being released in a major commercially available single format.

The song also holds the record for the longest reigning number one on Billboards Mainstream Top 40 chart for an all female collaboration, topping the chart for nine consecutive weeks. "Lady Marmalade" is the best-selling single for Lil' Kim and Mýa. Lil' Kim also held the record for having the longest number one single on the Billboard Hot 100 for a female rapper, with "Lady Marmalade" being on the top of the charts for five consecutive weeks, until Australian rapper Iggy Azalea's "Fancy" surpassed the record by holding on to the number one position for seven weeks in 2014. The song was included on non-US versions of Aguilera's first greatest hits album, Keeps Gettin' Better: A Decade of Hits. Lady Marmalade was the top selling song of 2001 and has sold 5.2 million copies worldwide as of December 2001.

Music video
The music video, directed by Paul Hunter, shows all four performers in lingerie in a cabaret-style video (with rapper Missy Elliott giving an introduction) and was filmed on sets built to resemble the actual Moulin Rouge night club around the turn of the 20th century. Interviewed by MTV News, the singers expressed their excitement about the video. Pink predicted the clip would be like a "circus on acid". Aguilera said, "The video's going to be dope," while elaborating on the video's concept: "We're going to be having cabaret costumes. It's something you've never seen from us before. So, it's going to be fun."

The video's art direction anachronistically merged hip-hop sensibility with the film's French cabaret setting, thanks to some props and costumes actually used in the movie, according to Hunter's office. Choreographer Tina Landon was hired to choreograph the video.

The video won the MTV Video Music Awards for "Best Video of the Year" and "Best Video from a Film". The song won the 2002 Grammy Award in the category of "Best Pop Collaboration with Vocals". In March 2021, Glenn Garner of the People magazine noted that "Lady Marmalade" "remains one of the most iconic music videos of our time".

Legacy
According to Kelley Dunlap of BuzzFeed, "Lady Marmalade" influenced Jessie J, Ariana Grande and Nicki Minaj's song "Bang Bang". It was featured in the music montage at the 92nd Academy Awards, which covered iconic movie soundtrack songs. It was also featured in the episode of the thirteenth season of RuPaul's Drag Race, where contestants Tina Burner, Elliott with 2 Ts and Kahmora Hall had to lipsync to it.

Broadway version
Moulin Rouge! — the musical — opened on Broadway at the Al Hirschfeld Theatre on July 25, 2019, featuring "Lady Marmalade" sung by The Lady M's: Nini Legs-in-the-Air (Robyn Hurder), Arabia (Holly James), Baby Doll (Jeigh Madjus) and La Chocolat (Jacqueline B. Arnold). The song has been used in many promotional videos and, both opens and closes the show. It has been announced that a full cast recording is set to come out in the Fall of 2019.

Track listing
 CD maxi
 "Lady Marmalade" (edit) – 4:24
 "Lady Marmalade" (Thunderpuss radio mix) – 4:09
 "Lady Marmalade" (Thunderpuss club mix) – 9:48
 "Lady Marmalade" (Thunderpuss Mixshow mix) – 6:21

Personnel

 Missy Elliott – producer, vocals
 Mýa – vocals
 P!nk – vocals
 Lil' Kim – vocals
 Christina Aguilera – vocals
 Bob Crewe – writer
 Kenny Nolan – writer
 Laura Ziffren – music supervisor, executive music producer
 Anton Monsted – music supervisor, executive music producer
 Ron Fair – vocal producer
 Michael Knobloch – music production supervisor
 John "Beetle" Bailey – assistant engineer
 Chris Barrett – assistant engineer
 Marius de Vries – music direction
 Ozzy Osbourne – performer
 Joe Leguabe – performer
 Robert Kraft – executive in charge of music
 Dylan Dresdow – engineer
 Chris Elliott – conductor
 Ricky Graham – assistant engineer
 Isobel Griffiths – orchestra contractor
 Jake Jackson – assistant engineer
 Jennie O'Grady – choir master
 Dave Pensado – mixing
 Carmen Rizzo – engineer
 Michael C. Ross – engineer
 Eddy Schreyer – mastering
 Brian Springer – engineer
 Gavyn Wright – orchestra leader

Charts

Weekly charts

Year-end charts

Decade-end charts

Certifications

Release history

References

External links
 

1974 singles
1974 songs
1987 singles
1998 singles
2001 singles
All Saints (group) songs
Baby Records singles
Billboard Hot 100 number-one singles
Cashbox number-one singles
Christina Aguilera songs
Dance-pop songs
Epic Records singles
European Hot 100 Singles number-one singles
Franglais songs
George Michael songs
Grammy Award for Best Pop Collaboration with Vocals
Grammy Hall of Fame Award recipients
Hip hop soul songs
Interscope Records singles
Irish Singles Chart number-one singles
Labelle songs
Lil' Kim songs
London Records singles
Macaronic songs
Moulin Rouge!
MTV Video of the Year Award
Music videos directed by Paul Hunter (director)
Mýa songs
Number-one singles in Australia
Number-one singles in Germany
Number-one singles in Greece
Number-one singles in Hungary
Number-one singles in New Zealand
Number-one singles in Norway
Number-one singles in Portugal
Number-one singles in Scotland
Number-one singles in Spain
Number-one singles in Sweden
Number-one singles in Switzerland
Pink (singer) songs
Sabrina Salerno songs
Song recordings produced by Frank Farian
Song recordings produced by Rockwilder
Songs about New Orleans
Songs about prostitutes
Songs written by Bob Crewe
Songs written by Kenny Nolan
UK Singles Chart number-one singles
United States National Recording Registry recordings
Universal Music Group singles
Works set in the Moulin Rouge